Véronique Brunet dit L’Estang (January 13, 1726 – June 12, 1810) was a Roman Catholic nun in the Congregation of Notre Dame of Montreal. She took the name Sister Sainte-Rose and served as superior general. She signed her name Verronique Létant.

The daughter of Jean Brunet dit L’Estang, and Marguerite Dubois, she was born in Pointe-Claire. In 2744, she became a novice in the Congregation of Notre-Dame in Montreal and, in 1746, took her vows as a nun. She served at the missions in the Lower Town of Quebec City, at Pointe-aux-Trembles and at Sainte-Famille on Île d’Orléans. In 1771, she returned to Montreal to serve as assistant to the superior Marie-Josèphe Maugue-Garreau. In 1772 she became superior. In 1778, she was succeeded by Marie Raizenne as superior; Brunet served as mistress of novices until 1784 when she served a second term as superior. In 1790, she became assistant mistress of novices; she also gave religious instruction to girls from Montreal who were not able to attend full-time classes. Later, she washed and mended the clothes of servant girls employed by the community.

Brunet died in Montreal at the age of 84.

References 

1726 births
1810 deaths
Canadian Roman Catholic religious sisters and nuns